Iniistius spilonotus, the three-banded razorfish or blue razor wrasse, is a species of marine ray-finned fish 
from the family Labridae, the wrasses. It is found in the Western Pacific Ocean.

References

spilonotus
Taxa named by Pieter Bleeker
Fish described in 1857